Fort Chiswell is a census-designated place (CDP) in Wythe County, Virginia, United States. The population was 939 at the 2010 census.

Fort Chiswell is located at the junction of Interstates 77 and 81. Going west from Fort Chiswell, drivers find themselves on a double wrong-way concurrency - one of few in the nation. Interstate 77 northbound is overlapped with Interstate 81 southbound, drivers will find themselves oriented the right way again when exiting I-81 back to I-77 north towards Charleston or south to Charlotte.

History
The community name is derived from a frontier fort built in 1758 as an outpost during the French and Indian War. The fort, which was of strategic importance during the American Revolution as the guardpost over a small deposit of lead used to mold bullets, was situated at the junction of the Great Trading Path and the Richmond Road, near the New River. The fort fell into disrepair in the 18th century as both the county seat and courthouse were moved from Fort Chiswell to the county seat of Wytheville, 12 miles to the west. The remaining foundations of the Fort and its surrounding buildings were completely covered over during the construction of I-77 in Wythe County during the 1970s. There is a pyramid shaped historical marker of sandstone situated approximately 200 yards west-northwest of the fort's original location next to the old chicken house.

The Fort Chiswell Site, The Mansion at Fort Chiswell, and McGavock Family Cemetery are listed on the National Register of Historic Places.

Schools
Fort Chiswell has a few different forms of both private and public schools, however there is only one private school in the town, which is named 'Kiddy Centre' which only allows for pre-school and daycare education. The public sector has two schools including the Fort Chiswell Middle School (FCMS) and the Fort Chiswell High school (FCHS) which have been merged into one secular school building. The current principals there are for the middle school are Tammy J. Watson and Vice Principal Chelsea R. Buchanan. Current Principals of the High School are James C. Suma and vice principal Holly L. Luper.

Geography
Fort Chiswell is located at  (36.943670, −80.940335).

According to the United States Census Bureau, the CDP has a total area of 12.1 square miles (31.3 km2), all land.

Demographics
As of the census of 2000, there were 911 people, 357 households, and 263 families residing in the CDP. The population density was 75.3 people per square mile (29.1/km2). There were 380 housing units at an average density of 31.4/sq mi (12.1/km2). The racial makeup of the CDP was 98.02% White, 0.77% African American, 0.11% Native American, 0.11% from other races, and 0.99% from two or more races. Hispanic or Latino of any race were 0.22% of the population.

There were 357 households, out of which 35.3% had children under the age of 18 living with them, 61.9% were married couples living together, 8.1% had a female householder with no husband present, and 26.1% were non-families. 21.0% of all households were made up of individuals, and 8.7% had someone living alone who was 65 years of age or older. The average household size was 2.54 and the average family size was 2.94.

In the CDP, the population was spread out, with 24.1% under the age of 18, 9.7% from 18 to 24, 32.7% from 25 to 44, 23.6% from 45 to 64, and 9.9% who were 65 years of age or older. The median age was 36 years. For every 100 females, there were 98.5 males. For every 100 females age 18 and over, there were 94.1 males.

The median income for a household in the CDP was $37,273, and the median income for a family was $40,417. Males had a median income of $35,464 versus $20,385 for females. The per capita income for the CDP was $15,614. About 7.7% of families and 8.5% of the population were below the poverty line, including 12.4% of those under age 18 and 14.6% of those age 65 or over.

References

External links
 Wythe County Virginia, Fort Chiswell

Census-designated places in Virginia
Census-designated places in Wythe County, Virginia
U.S. Route 11